The First Van Cliburn International Piano Competition took place in Fort Worth, Texas from September 24 to October 7, 1962. It was won by American pianist Ralph Votapek, while Soviets Nikolai Petrov and Mikhail Voskresensky earned the silver and bronze medals.

Jurors
  Leopold Mannes, Chairman
  Yara Bernette
  Jorge Bolet
  Angelo Eagon
  Rudolph Ganz
  Luis Herrera de la Fuente
  Motonari Iguchi
  Milton Katims
  Lili Kraus
  Lev Oborin
  Leonard Pennario
  Serge Saxe (local chairman)

Results

References

Van Cliburn International Piano Competition